Chloropterus is a genus of leaf beetles in the subfamily Eumolpinae. It is distributed in Eastern Europe, West to Central Asia and North Africa.

The genus was originally established under the name Heterocnemis by the Russian entomologist Ferdinand Morawitz in 1860 for a single species, Heterocnemis versicolor. However, the name Heterocnemis had already been used for a genus of flower chafers (Cetoniinae), so Morawitz renamed his genus to Chloropterus the following year.

Species
 Chloropterus bimaculatus (Raffray, 1873)
 Chloropterus fiorii Ruffo, 1965
 Chloropterus grandis Weise, 1889
 Chloropterus inornatus (Chen, 1935)
 Chloropterus lefevrei Reitter, 1890
 Chloropterus lefevrei arabicus Lopatin, 2008
 Chloropterus lefevrei lefevrei Reitter, 1890
 Chloropterus mateui (Selman, 1969)
 Chloropterus moldaviensis Pic, 1909
 Chloropterus ornatus Lopatin, 1984
 Chloropterus pallidus Chobaut, 1898
 Chloropterus persicus (Baly, 1878)
 Chloropterus politus Berti & Rapilly, 1973
 Chloropterus stigmaticollis Fairmaire, 1875
 Chloropterus unguiculatus Lopatin, 1977
 Chloropterus versicolor (Morawitz, 1860)

References

Eumolpinae
Chrysomelidae genera
Beetles of North Africa
Beetles of Asia
Beetles of Europe